Walls may refer to:

The plural of wall, a structure
Walls (surname), a list of notable people with the surname

Places 
Walls, Louisiana, United States
Walls, Mississippi, United States
Walls, Ontario, neighborhood in Perry, Ontario, Canada
Walls, Shetland, Scotland, United Kingdom
South Walls, Orkney Islands, Scotland, United Kingdom

Music 
The Walls, Irish rock band
Walls (band), British electronic indie duo

Albums
Walls (EP), a 2005 EP by The Red Paintings
Walls (Apparat album), 2007
Walls (An Horse album), 2011
Walls (Gateway Worship album), 2015
Walls (Kings of Leon album), 2016
Walls (Barbra Streisand album), 2018
Walls (Louis Tomlinson album), 2020

Songs
"Walls" (Icehouse song), 1980
"Walls" (Kings of Leon song), 2016
"Walls" (Louis Tomlinson song), 2020
"Walls" (Ruben song), 2017
"Walls" (The Rocket Summer song), 2010
"Walls" (Yes song), 1994
"Walls (Circus)", a song by Tom Petty and the Heartbreakers, 1996
"The Walls" (song), a song by Mario, 2011
"Walls", an unreleased song by electronic music duo Elite Gymnastics
"Walls", a song by DC Talk from their 1990 album Nu Thang
"Walls", a song by Gordon Lightfoot from his album The Way I Feel
"Walls", a song by John Frusciante and Josh Klinghoffer from their 2004 album A Sphere in the Heart of Silence
"Mury" (song) (translated as Walls), a song by Jacek Kaczmarski

Other uses 
Walls (1968 film)
Walls (1984 film)
"Walls", an episode of Power Rangers S.P.D.

See also 
Wall's (disambiguation)
Walls House (disambiguation), several houses in the United States
Wall (disambiguation)